Francis Preserved Leavenworth (September 3, 1858 in Mount Vernon, Indiana – November 12, 1928; a.k.a. Frank Leavenworth) was an American astronomer.  He discovered many New General Catalogue objects together with Frank Muller and Ormond Stone.  They used a telescope with a 66-cm aperture at the Leander McCormick Observatory at the University of Virginia in Charlottesville, Virginia.

He became a member of the Camden Astronomical Society shortly after its founding in 1888.

In 1909 he joined Frederick C. Leonard's Society for Practical Astronomy.

See also 
 New General Catalogue
 Observational astronomy

References

External links 
 
 Publications by F. P. Leavenworth in the Astrophysics Data System

Discoveries by Francis Leavenworth
19th-century American astronomers
20th-century American astronomers
1858 births
1928 deaths